The men's flyweight event was part of the boxing programme at the 1992 Summer Olympics. The weight class allowed boxers of up to 51 kilograms to compete. The competition was held from 27 July to 9 August 1992. 31 boxers from 31 nations competed.

Medalists

Results
The following boxers took part in the event:

First round
 Timothy Austin (USA) – BYE
 Yuliyan Strogov (BUL) def. Ronnie Noan (PNG), RSCI-2 (02:03)
 Luis Claudio Freitas (BRA) def. Gwang-Hyung Han (KOR), 15:9
 Benjamin Mwangata (TAN) def. Narciso González (MEX), RSCH-3 (01:43)
 Raúl González (CUB) def. Leszek Olszewski (POL), 15:7
 Moses Malagu (NGR) def. Paul Buttimer (IRL), 12:8
 Mario Loch (GER) def. Vichai Khadpo (THA), RSCI-2 (00:16)
 David Serradas (VEN) def. Angel Chacón (PUR), 12:3
 Héctor Avila (DOM) def. Liu Gang (CHN), RSC-2 (02:38)
 Isidrio Visvera (PHI) def. Stanislav Vagaský (TCH), 17:0
 István Kovács (HUN) def. Dharmendra Yadav (IND), 21:5
 Jesper Jensen (DEN) def. Hamid Berhili (MAR), 10:4
 Paul Ingle (GBR) def. Alexander Baba (GHA), 9:7
 Choi Chol-Su (PRK) def. Moustafa Esmail (EGY), 7:4
 Yacin Chikh (ALG) def. Anatoly Filipov (EUN), 5:3
 Robert Peden (AUS) def. Marty O'Donnell (CAN), 14:2

Second round
 Timothy Austin (USA) def. Yuliyan Strogov (BUL), 19:7
 Benjamin Mwangata (TAN) def. Luis Claudio Freitas (BRA), 8:7
 Raúl González (CUB) def. Moses Malagu (NGR), RSCI-2 (00:23)
 David Serradas (VEN) def. Mario Loch (GER), 9:4
 Héctor Avila (DOM) def. Isidrio Visvera (PHI), 17:5
 István Kovács (HUN) def. Jesper Jensen (DEN), 14:0
 Choi Chol-Su (PRK) def. Paul Ingle (GBR), 13:12
 Robert Peden (AUS) def. Yacin Chikh (ALG), KO-2 (00:21)

Quarterfinals
 Timothy Austin (USA) def. Benjamin Mwangata (TAN), 19:8
 Raúl González (CUB) def. David Serradas (VEN), 14:7
 István Kovács (HUN) def. Héctor Avila (DOM), 17:3
 Choi Chol-Su (PRK) def. Robert Peden (AUS), 25:11

Semifinals
 Raúl González (CUB) def. Timothy Austin (USA) RSCH-1 (01:04)
 Choi Chol-Su (PRK) def. István Kovács (HUN), 10:5

Final
 Choi Chol-Su (PRK) def. Raúl González (CUB), 12:2

References

Flyweight